Deparia petersenii subsp. congrua, commonly known as Japanese lady fern, is a fern found in Australia, Malesia and Polynesia. It may be found in a variety of different habitats, such as close to stream banks, and damp rock faces and crevices, often in a large colony.

References

Flora of New South Wales
Flora of Victoria (Australia)
Flora of Queensland
Flora of Malesia
Flora of Polynesia
Flora of Lord Howe Island
Flora of Norfolk Island
Athyriaceae
Plant subspecies